Eagle Creek is an unincorporated community in Clackamas County, Oregon, United States. It is located seven miles southwest of Sandy, seven miles north of Estacada, and five miles southeast of Carver, at the junction of Oregon Routes 224 and 211, on the Clackamas River.

History
The community was named after Eagle Creek, a local stream, which in turn was named after the large population of eagles in the area. The community was called "Eagle Creek" as early as 1844, and the post office established in 1867. Philip Foster established a farm here.

Climate
This region experiences warm (but not hot) and dry summers, with no average monthly temperatures above 71.6 °F.  According to the Köppen Climate Classification system, Eagle Creek has a warm-summer Mediterranean climate, abbreviated "Csb" on climate maps.

Sports and recreation
The Eagle Creek Golf Course is an 18-hole regulation sized golf course.

References

Portland metropolitan area
Unincorporated communities in Clackamas County, Oregon
1844 establishments in Oregon Country
Unincorporated communities in Oregon
Populated places established in 1844